Protrechina is an extinct, monotypic genus of ant, first described by Wilson (1985) from a Middle Eocene fossil found near Malvern, Arkansas. The genus contains a single described species Protrechina carpenteri known from a solitary worker entombed in Claiborne Formation amber.

References

Further reading
Protrechina - AntWiki

Formicinae
Monotypic ant genera
Fossil ant genera